Leirvogsvatn is a small lake, located about  northeast of Reykjavík, Iceland. It lies along Route 36. Fed by the Leirvogsvatn River, the lake is the subject of a legend in the form of a horse-shaped monster. The lake is known to contain populations of Gasterosteus islandicus.

References

Lakes of Iceland